Zambia competed in the 2008 Summer Paralympics in Beijing, China. The country's delegation consisted of a single athlete, middle-distance runner Larson Katongo. The 21-year-old Katongo, who is visually impaired, participated in the 800 metre and 1500 metre events. Although he had competed in international meets before, this was his first Paralympic Games. Katongo's trainer is Paul Mwansa.

Athletics

Men

See also
2008 Summer Paralympics
Zambia at the Paralympics
Zambia at the 2008 Summer Olympics

References

External links
Beijing 2008 Paralympic Games Official Site
International Paralympic Committee

Nations at the 2008 Summer Paralympics
2008
Paralympics